This is a list of notable Spanish desserts.

Spanish desserts

 
 s

See also

 List of desserts
 List of Spanish dishes
 Spanish cuisine

References

 
Spanish
Desserts